"Kevin's Heart" is a song by American rapper J. Cole, released on April 20, 2018 from his fifth studio album, KOD, and was produced by T-Minus and Mark Pelli, making it the only track on the album not to be produced by Cole

Lyrical interpretation
Vice said the song "considers the thinking behind a man's unfaithfulness. The fact that the song goes its entirety without the offender once blaming his spouse for his actions is a serious "whew" moment. Here, Cole frames temptation as a habit that needs kicking." Billboard mentioned that "the song tells the tale of fighting off the urge to cheat."

Music video
On April 24, 2018, Cole released the music video for the song, "Kevin's Heart". The video features comedian Kevin Hart, and was directed by Cole and Scott Lazer.

Critical reception
Pitchfork called the song a standout saying "Cole uses the pint-sized comedian's very public infidelities to reflect on the challenge of monogamy: "My phone be blowing up/Temptations on my line/I stare at the screen a while before I press decline." Cole is most effective when he keeps things personal rather than turning up his nose at the choices of others."

Commercial performance
Upon its first week of release, "Kevin's Heart" debuted at number eight on the US Billboard Hot 100.  On July 29, 2020,  "Kevin's Heart" was certified platinum by the Recording Industry Association of America (RIAA) for combined sales of one million units in the United States.

Charts

Certifications

References

2018 songs
J. Cole songs
Songs written by J. Cole
Songs written by T-Minus (record producer)
Songs written by Mark "Pelli" Pellizzer
Song recordings produced by T-Minus (record producer)